A Boyfriend for My Wife is a blockbuster 2008 Argentine romantic comedy film directed by Juan Taratuto and starring Adrián Suar, Valeria Bertuccelli, and Gabriel Goity.

It was the highest grossing Argentine film in 2008. In 2009, Warner Bros. bought the rights of the film. A South Korean remake directed by Min Kyu-dong, All About My Wife, was released in 2012. Pantelion Films released a Mexican remake called Busco novio para mi mujer in 2016. An Italian remake was also released, called "Un Fidanzato Per Mia Mogile"Un fidanzato per mia moglie, in 2014. An Indian Tamil-language remake, Hey Sinamika was released in 2022, with dubbed versions in Malayalam, Telugu and other Indian languages.

Plot 
The film is about "Tenso" (Suar), a timid husband who is fed up with his wife "Tana" (Bertuccelli) who dislikes and complains about everything.  He hires "Cuervo" Flores (Goity), a professional Casanova to seduce Tana, hoping this will make her divorce him.  To aid with that seduction, Tenso gets his wife Tana a job at a local radio station where her morning talk show complaining about what she dislikes becomes popular.  Cuervo proceeds to try to seduce Tana and professes to Tenso that he has fallen in love with Tana.  Tenso confesses to Tana that he had set up the seduction, and she confesses that she has been seduced by the radio station manager.  Tenso and Tana proceed with a divorce, and, reconcile before the divorce can be finalized.

Cast 
 Adrián Suar as Diego "Tenso" Polski
 Valeria Bertuccelli as Andrea "Tana" Ferro
 Gabriel Goity as "Cuervo" Flores
 Marcelo Xicarte as Carlos, "Tenso"'s friend
 Luis Herrera as "Negro", "Tenso"'s friend
 Martín Salazar as  Gabriel, "Tenso"'s friend
 Oscar Núñez as Amílcar
 Benjamín Amadeo as Damián Kepelsky, a local radio station's host and "Tana"'s boss
 Mercedes Morán as the voice of Blanca, a couples therapist
 Julieta Zylberberg as María, a receptionist at Kepelsky's radio station
 Violeta Urtizberea as Paola, Carlos' younger wife
 Lucía Maciel as Lorena, Paola's sister
 Daniel Casablanca as Marito

Remakes

References

External links 
 

2008 films
2000s Spanish-language films
2008 romantic comedy films
Films set in Buenos Aires
Films shot in Buenos Aires
Argentine romantic comedy films
Films distributed by Disney
2000s Argentine films